The Red Declaration is a document published in Tampere on 14 November 1905, though it was dated under the "old style" calendar used in the Russian Empire at the time as 1 November 1905. It called for the Senate of Finland to resign; demanded universal suffrage, freedom of assembly, and freedom of association; as well as asking for an end to censorship.

The text was drafted by Yrjö Mäkelin, the chief editor of the Tampere social democratic newspaper Kansan Lehti  on 12 November (30 October O.S.), during the time of the general strike in response to the Russian Revolution. It was read out by poet Kössi Lindström on the balcony of Tampere Town Hall on 14 November.

The declaration was printed on red paper, from which it got its name; this was not an intentional reference to the political left. The text contained the demands of the workers, but even the constitutionalists endorsed its contents.

External links

Political history of Finland
1905 in Finland